The Metal Conqueror Tour was a concert tour by English heavy metal band Judas Priest in support of the album Defenders of the Faith. It ran from 20 January until 13 September 1984.

Following the tour, the band took a one-year hiatus from touring, apart from a brief performance at the 1985 Live Aid concert in Philadelphia.

Recordings

The 2015 release of Defenders of the Faith's 30th anniversary edition features the concert from 5 May 1984 in Long Beach Arena, Long Beach, California in its entirety. Prior to this release, select tracks from the same concert were featured as bonus tracks on  the 2001 remasters of Sin After Sin, British Steel, Defenders of the Faith, Priest...Live! and Ram It Down.

Production
The stage production featured a large drum riser prop in the shape of the Metallian that adorns the Defenders of the Faith album cover. During the concert, the band members would enter the stage through the prop's mouth or under either of its raisable legs. Halford's staple live stunt of riding a motorcycle on stage had him emerge from under the one of the legs.

Europe warm-up leg
A special pre-Defenders of the Faith mini tour took place in the United Kingdom and Germany, which went from 12 to 22 December 1983 with support act Quiet Riot. They would also perform at the Rock Pop Festival at Westfalenhallen in Dortmund on 18 December with Iron Maiden, Scorpions, Ozzy Osbourne, Def Leppard and Quiet Riot.

Setlist

"The Hellion" [Audio Intro]
"Electric Eye"
"Riding on the Wind"
"Heading Out to the Highway"
"Grinder"
"Metal Gods"
"Bloodstone"
"Breaking the Law"
"Sinner"
"Desert Plains"
"The Ripper"
"Freewheel Burning"
"Devil's Child"
"Screaming for Vengeance"
"You've Got Another Thing Comin'"
"Victim of Changes"
"Living After Midnight"  [1st Encore]
"The Green Manalishi" (Fleetwood Mac cover) [Second encore]
"Hell Bent for Leather" [Final encore]

"The Hellion" [Audio intro]
"Electric Eye"
"Riding on the Wind"
"Grinder"
"Metal Gods"
"Bloodstone"
"Breaking the Law"
"Sinner"
"Desert Plains"
"The Ripper"
"Freewheel Burning"
"Screaming for Vengeance"
"You've Got Another Thing Comin'"
"Victim of Changes"
"Living After Midnight" [First encore]
"The Green Manalishi" (Fleetwood Mac cover) [Second encore]
"Hell Bent for Leather" [Final encore]

Tour dates

Setlist
The setlist varied throughout the tour. The European setlist consisted of:

"The Hellion" (Taped intro)
 "Electric Eye"
 "Riding on the Wind"
 "Grinder"
 "Metal Gods"
 "Bloodstone"
 "Breaking the Law"
 "Sinner"
 "Desert Plains"
 "The Ripper"
 "Heavy Duty" (Added on 2 February 1984)
 "Defenders Of The Faith" (Added on 2 February 1984)
 "Freewheel Burning"
 "Screaming For Vengeance" (Replaced by "Some Heads Are Gonna Roll" after 28 January 1984)
 "You've Got Another Thing Comin'"
 "Victim of Changes"
 "Living After Midnight"
 "The Green Manalishi (With the Two Prong Crown)" (Fleetwood Mac cover)
 "Hell Bent for Leather"
The U.S. setlist consisted of:
 "Love Bites"
 "Jawbreaker"
 "Grinder"
 "Metal Gods"
 "Breaking the Law"
 "Sinner"
 "Desert Plains"
 "Some Heads Are Gonna Roll"
 "The Sentinel"
 "Rock Hard, Ride Free"
 "Night Comes Down"
 "Electric Eye"
 "Heavy Duty"
 "Defenders of the Faith"
 "Freewheel Burning"
 "Victim of Changes"
 "The Green Manalishi (With the Two Prong Crown)" (Fleetwood Mac cover)
 "Living After Midnight"
 "Hell Bent for Leather"
 "You've Got Another Thing Comin'"
"Heading Out to the Highway" was also played on 9 June.

Tour dates
The band toured with Ted Nugent and Raven on the European leg and Great White and Kick Axe on the North American leg.

On 18 June 1984, at Madison Square Garden in New York City, several riots broke out, and the crowd also brawled with venue security and arriving NYPD officers - some in full riot gear - which prompted the venue to ban Priest.

"Madison Square Garden banned us for life", recalled Glenn Tipton. "The audience went berserk and ripped all the seats out. They cost more than a quarter of a million dollars to replace. Me and Ken [KK Downing] went back there to see a tennis match which John McEnroe was playing in. We went incognito, wearing hoodies so no one would recognize us, but the ushers came up to us and said, 'Thanks for the new seats, guys.'"

Boxscore

References

Judas Priest concert tours
1984 concert tours